Joseph Roberts may refer to:

Arts and entertainment
Joe Roberts (actor) (1871–1923), American comic actor
Joe Roberts (artist), American artist
Joe Roberts (musician), English musician
Joe Roberts, English actor known for portraying John Webster in Shakespeare in Love

Sports
Joe Roberts (basketball) (1936–2022), American basketball player
Joe Roberts (curler), American curler
Joe Roberts (footballer) (1900–1984), English professional footballer
Joe Roberts (motorcyclist) (born 1997), American motorcycle racer
Joe Roberts (rugby union) (born 2000), Welsh rugby union player

Others
Joseph Jenkins Roberts (1809–1876), 1st and 7th President of Liberia
Joseph J. Roberts (born 1952), Speaker of the New Jersey General Assembly
Joseph Roberts (motivational speaker) (born 1966), Canadian motivational speaker and author